Siliștea is a commune located in Brăila County, Muntenia, Romania. It is composed of six villages: Cotu Lung, Cotu Mihalea, Mărtăcești, Muchea, Siliștea and Vameșu.

References

Communes in Brăila County
Localities in Muntenia